Lycée Emmanuel Mounier may refer to the following French schools:
Lycée Emmanuel Mounier - Angers
 - Châtenay-Malabry
 - Grenoble